Yanislav Gerchev (born 4 October 1989) is a Bulgarian judoka. He competed at the 2016 Summer Olympics in the men's 60 kg event, in which he was eliminated in the third round by Amiran Papinashvili.

References

External links
 
 

1989 births
Living people
Bulgarian male judoka
Olympic judoka of Bulgaria
Judoka at the 2016 Summer Olympics
Judoka at the 2015 European Games
European Games competitors for Bulgaria
Judoka at the 2019 European Games
Judoka at the 2020 Summer Olympics